George Joseph Donnelly (April 23, 1889 – December 13, 1950) was an American prelate of the Roman Catholic Church who served as bishop of the Diocese of Leavenworth (1946–1947) and the Diocese of Kansas City in Kansas (1947–1950).

Biography
Donnelly was born in St. Louis, Missouri, and studied at Kenrick Seminary before being ordained to the priesthood on June 12, 1921. He was named chancellor of the Archdiocese of St. Louis in 1929.

On March 19, 1940, he was appointed Auxiliary Bishop of St. Louis and Titular Bishop of Coela by Pope Pius XII. He received his episcopal consecration on the following April 23 from Archbishop John J. Glennon, with Bishops Christian Herman Winkelmann and Paul Clarence Schulte serving as co-consecrators.

He was named the sixth Bishop of Leavenworth, Kansas on November 9, 1946. The diocese was renamed as the Diocese of Kansas City in Kansas May 10, 1947. He remained as bishop until his death at age 61.

References

1889 births
1950 deaths
Clergy from St. Louis
Roman Catholic Archdiocese of St. Louis
Kenrick–Glennon Seminary alumni
Roman Catholic bishops of Leavenworth
Roman Catholic bishops of Kansas City in Kansas
20th-century Roman Catholic bishops in the United States
Religious leaders from Missouri